Federico Mercuri and Giordano Cremona (both born in 1992), known professionally as Merk & Kremont are two Italian DJs, songwriters, record producers and remixers from Milan. In 2014 they were included in the top 100 of the world's DJ compiled by DJ Magazine in 94th place.

Awards and nominations

Discography

Singles

Remixes
 2011: Andry J - My Beat (Merk & Kremont Remix) [NuZone Gears]
 2014: Promise Land, Alicia Madison - Sun Shine Down (Merk & Kremont Remix) [Mixmash Records]
 2014: Chris Lake, Jareth - Helium (Merk & Kremont Remix) [Ultra]
 2014: Syn Cole - Miami 82 (Merk & Kremont Remix) [LE7ELS]
 2014: Pink Is Punk - Pinball (Merk & Kremont Edit) [Rising Music]
 2014: Shawnee Taylor, Helena - Levity (Merk & Kremont Remix) [Ultra]
 2014: Nicky Romero, Anouk - Feet On The Ground (Merk & Kremont Remix) [Protocol Recordings]
 2015: Steve Aoki, Walk off the Earth - Home We'll Go (Take My Hand) (Merk & Kremont Remix) [Ultra]
 2016: Bob Sinclar - Someone Who Needs Me (Merk & Kremont vs Sunstars Remix) [Spinnin Remixes]
 2017: Sage the Gemini - Now & Later (Merk & Kremont Remix) [Atlantic]
 2017: Avicii, Sandro Cavazza - Without You (Merk & Kremont Mix) [Universal]
 2018: Betta Lemme - Bambola'' (Merk & Kremont Mix) [Ultra Music]
 2022: RYOYA - Own It (Merk & Kremont Remix)

Bootleg
 2016: Star Wars - Merk & Kremont Bootleg

References

External links
Official website
Beatport
Spotify Artist Profile

Italian DJs
Italian house musicians
Electronic music duos
Electro house musicians
Spinnin' Records artists
Electronic dance music DJs